A boxing ring, often referred to simply as a ring or the squared circle, is the space in which a boxing match occurs. A modern ring consists of a square raised platform with a post at each corner. Four ropes are attached to the posts and pulled parallel under tension with turnbuckles to form the boundary of the competition area.

Construction
As there are a number of professional boxing organizations, the standards of construction vary. The ropes are attached together with spacers that prevent them from spreading too far apart.

Construction of the ring environment extends to maximization of lighting in the ring, minimization of heat of the lighting, and a complete as possible cut-off of illumination at the ringside.

Construction differs from the similar wrestling ring. A wrestling ring sports only three ropes (which may be sheathed steel cable) and is constructed to provide a more flexible mat surface than a boxing ring.

Terminology
The name "ring" is a relic from when contests were fought in a roughly drawn circle on the ground. The name ring continued with the London Prize Ring Rules in 1743, which specified a small circle in the centre of the fight area where the boxers met at the start of each round. The first square ring was introduced by the Pugilistic Society in 1838. That ring was specified as  square and bound by two ropes. For these and other reasons, the boxing ring is commonly referred to as the "squared circle". The term "ringside seat" dates as far back as the 1860s.

See also
 Ring girl
 Dohyō
 Octagon (mixed martial arts)

References
 

ring
Martial arts equipment